
Year 402 (CDII) was a common year starting on Wednesday (link will display the full calendar) of the Julian calendar. At the time, it was known as the Year of the Consulship of Arcadius and Honorius (or, less frequently, year 1155 Ab urbe condita). The denomination 402 for this year has been used since the early medieval period, when the Anno Domini calendar era became the prevalent method in Europe for naming years.

Events 
 By place 

 Roman Empire 
 The Visigoths advance on Mediolanum (modern Milan) and besiege Asti in Liguria. King Alaric I sends envoys to negotiate a peace, but the Roman government refuses to make deals with "barbarians."
 April 6 – Battle of Pollentia: Stilicho recalls troops from Britain and the Rhine frontier to defend Italy. He decides to attack the Goths on Easter Sunday, and manages to capture Alaric's wife and children.
 Emperors Arcadius and his younger brother Honorius become Roman consuls.

 Asia 
 King Gwanggaeto the Great of Goguryeo (Korea) defeats the forces of Later Yan, seizing some of their border fortresses.
 The Avars, led by Shelun (Chö-louen), having defeated the Gaoju Dingling (Kao-kiu Ting-ling) near Kobbo, establish a nomadic empire that ranges from Mongolia to the Irtysh.
 Fa-Hien, Chinese Buddhist monk, makes a pilgrimage to India, initiating Sino-Indian relations. Stirred by his faith to Buddhism, he visits the sites of Siddhartha Gautama's life.
 Silseong becomes king of the Korean kingdom of Silla.

 By topic 

 Religion 
 Jerome writes "Apologiae contra Rufinum" and "Liber tertius seu ultima responsio adversus scripta Rufini".
 The Pure Land school of Buddhism founds a monastery upon the top of Mount Lushan.
 Cynegius, acting for Emperor Arcadius at the insistence of Bishop Porphyry, orders the destruction of pagan temples in Gaza.

Births

Deaths 
 Empress Dowager Ding, mother of Murong Sheng
 Quintus Aurelius Symmachus, Roman consul and intellectual
 Sima Yuanxian, regent during the Jin Dynasty (b. 382)
 Tufa Lilugu, prince of the Xianbei state Southern Liang

References